Khezi is a village in Matobo District, Matabeleland South province in zimbabwe, located  south of Bulawayo and  from Maphisa, a small town which serves as the seat of Matobo District, and about  from the province's capital Gwanda.

References

Populated places in Matabeleland South Province